The 2011 season was Sangju Sangmu Phoenix's tenth season in the K-League in South Korea. Sangju Sangmu Phoenix was competing in K-League, League Cup and Korean FA Cup.

Current squad

Match results

K-League

League table

Results summary

Results by round

Korean FA Cup

League Cup

Squad statistics

Appearances and goals
Statistics accurate as of match played 30 October 2011

Top scorers

Top assistors

Discipline

Transfer

In

 26 July 2011 –  Lee Sang-Ki – Suwon Samsung Bluewings

Out
 17 June 2011 –  Kim Dong-hyun – Released (termination of contract)
 7 July 2011 –  Kim Jee-Hyuk – Released (under arrest)
 7 July 2011 –  Park Sang-Cheol – Released (under arrest)
 7 July 2011 –  Ju Kwang-Youn – Released (under arrest)
 7 July 2011 –  Yoon Yeo-San – Released (under indictment)
 7 July 2011 –  Jang Nam-Seok – Released (under indictment)
 7 July 2011 –  Hwang Ji-Yoon – Released (under indictment)
 7 July 2011 –  Lee Jun-Young – Released (under indictment)
 7 July 2011 –  Lim In-Sung – Released (under indictment)
 21 September 2011 –  Kim Jung-Woo – Seongnam Ilhwa Chunma (discharge from the army)
 21 September 2011 –  Cho Jae-Yong – Gyeongnam FC (discharge from the army)
 21 September 2011 –  Jung Kyung-ho – Chunnam Dragons (discharge from the army)
 21 September 2011 –  Cho Yong-Tae – Suwon Samsung Bluewings (discharge from the army)
 21 September 2011 –  Kim Sun-Woo – Incheon United (discharge from the army)
 21 September 2011 –  Park Jung-Sik – Daegu FC (discharge from the army)
 21 September 2011 –  Kim Ju-Hwan – Daegu FC (discharge from the army)
 21 September 2011 –  Kim Ji-min – Daejeon Citizen (discharge from the army)
 21 September 2011 –  Yoon Sin-Young – Daejeon Citizen (discharge from the army)
 21 September 2011 –  Lee Je-Kyu – Daejeon Citizen (discharge from the army)
 21 September 2011 –  Kwak Chul-Ho – Daejeon Citizen (discharge from the army)
 21 September 2011 –  Oh Chang-Sik – Ulsan Hyundai (discharge from the army)
 21 September 2011 –  Kim Young-Sam – Ulsan Hyundai (discharge from the army)
 21 September 2011 –  Kim Min-O – Ulsan Hyundai (discharge from the army)
 21 September 2011 –  Byun Woong – Ulsan Hyundai (discharge from the army)

References

Sangju Sangmu Phoenix
2011